Charles Leslie may refer to:
Charles Leslie (nonjuror) (1650–1722), Irish Anglican priest and nonjuror
Charles Leslie (bishop) (1810–1870), Irish Anglican bishop of Kilmore, Elphin and Ardagh, great-great-grandson of the above
Charles Leslie (cricketer) (1861–1921), English cricketer
Charles Leslie (writer) (fl. 1710), Barbadian writer
Charles Leslie (painter) (1839–1886), English painter
Charles Robert Leslie (1794–1859), English painter
Charles Powell Leslie (1731–1800), member of the Irish Parliament for Hillsborough and later Monaghan County
Charles Powell Leslie (1769–1831), Irish member of the UK Parliament for Monaghan and later New Ross
Charles Powell Leslie (1821–1871), Irish member and later Lord Lieutenant of Monaghan
Charles Miller Leslie (1923–2009), American medical anthropologist